Krakatoa: The Day the World Exploded is a 2003 book by Simon Winchester covering the 1883 eruption of Krakatoa.

Summary
Winchester examines the annihilation in 1883 of the volcano-island of Krakatoa, which was followed by an immense tsunami that killed nearly forty thousand people. Effects of the immense waves were felt as far away as France, and the sound of the island's destruction—per Winchester—could be heard as far away as Australia and India.

Critical reception
In The New York Times, critic Janet Maslin called Krakatoa "a trove of wonderfully arcane information." Maslin added, "The author has been able to attach so many tentacles to a single event – the spectacular and catastrophic explosion of the title volcano – that there seems to be nowhere he can't go." The book was a New York Times bestseller after its initial release.

References

External links
 Krakatoa: The Day the World Exploded: August 27, 1883; accessed October 31, 2013
Presentation by Winchester on Krakatoa, April 10, 2003, C-SPAN

Books by Simon Winchester
History books about Indonesia
Krakatoa
2003 non-fiction books